Bengali or Bengalee, or Bengalese may refer to:
something of, from, or related to Bengal, a large region in South Asia
 Bengalis, an ethnic and linguistic group of the region
 Bengali language, the language they speak
 Bengali alphabet, the writing system
 Bengali–Assamese script
 Bengali (Unicode block), a block of Bengali characters in Unicode

Other usage

People
 Abdul Wahid Bengali, 19th-century theologian
 Ali Sher Bengali, 16th-century Sufi
 Athar Ali Bengali, politician and teacher
 Bengali-Fodé Koita, Guinean footballer
 Bengali Keïta, Guinean centre-back
 Bengali Singh, Indian politician
 Izzatullah Bengali, 18th-century Persian language author
 Mohamed Bengali, Ivorian footballer
 Muhammad Salih Bengali, 18th-century Islamic scholar
 Shah Nuri Bengali, 18th-century Sufi and author
 Usman Bengali, 16th-century Muslim scholar
 Yusuf Bengali, 16th-century Sufi

Places
 Bengali Market, a market in New Delhi, India
 Bengali, Nancowry, a village in Andaman and Nicobar Islands, India

Miscellaneous
 Bangali River, river in northern Bangladesh
 , a ship launched in 1837 and wrecked in 1951 
 Bengali, a fictional catlike humanoid alien character from ThunderCats

See also
 

Language and nationality disambiguation pages